The General Avia F 22 Pinguino is an Italian two-seat aircraft by GeneralAvia. It was designed by Stelio Frati and is his 22nd design. The aircraft was manufactured in four configurations, the "A" model with fixed gear, 116 hp Lycoming (O-235-N2C), & fixed prop, the "B" model same as the "A" but with uprated 160Hp Lycoming engine (O-320-D2A), the "R" model with retractable gear, the same 160 Hp Lycoming (O-320-D2A) and the "C" model with retractable gear, constant speed prop, and 180 HP Lycoming (O-360-A1A). The aircraft has two side-by-side seats in an enclosed cockpit.

The F.22 is certified in the aerobatic category capable of from -3g to +6g. The "C" model is used by a Netherlands aerobatic display team called "Red Sensation".

The production of the F 22 series began, after the prototypes and four pre-series aircraft manufactured, under the Technical Direction of Eng Pasquale De Rosa. In this phase were produced and sold about 30 aircraft and the mass production was structured. The Eng Pasquale De Rosa performed project engineering by reducing the hours of production from about 6000 to about 2000 hours making hundreds of improving changes, all certified. In this configuration the aircraft was certified as well as in Italy and in the US in England, Holland, France, New Zealand.

Specifications F.22/C

References

Bibliography
 Taylor, Michael. Brassey's World Aircraft & Systems Directory 1996/97. London:Brassey's, 1996. .

External links

1990s Italian civil utility aircraft
Low-wing aircraft
Single-engined tractor aircraft